Carlos Reyes Argibay (1957 – 11 June 2009) was an Uruguayan football player and manager.

Career
Born in Montevideo, Reyes began playing as a creative midfielder for local side Nacional, the club his parents supported. When he joined rivals Peñarol, his family were upset. At age 29, Reyes moved abroad to play in El Salvador, and ended his career playing in Honduras with Real España and in Guatemala with Aurora.

References

External links
chron

 “Siempre dije que he sido aliancista” - La Prensa Gráfica 

1957 births
2009 deaths
Real C.D. España players
Uruguayan footballers
Club Nacional de Football players
Peñarol players
Alianza F.C. footballers
Expatriate footballers in El Salvador
Expatriate football managers in El Salvador
Expatriate footballers in Honduras
Liga Nacional de Fútbol Profesional de Honduras players
Association football midfielders
Uruguayan football managers